NUR International University is a private University. It is located in Lahore, Pakistan. It was founded in 2015.

References

External links
NUR International University official website

2015 establishments in Pakistan
Educational institutions established in 2015
Private universities and colleges in Punjab, Pakistan
Lahore
Universities and colleges in Lahore